Michel Renard (born 24 September 1924, Marigot, Martinique; died 17 December 2015, Fort-de-France) was a politician from Martinique who served in the French National Assembly from 1986-1988.

References 

1924 births
2015 deaths
People from Le Marigot
Martiniquais politicians
Rally for the Republic politicians
Deputies of the 8th National Assembly of the French Fifth Republic